Sing in Praise: A Collection of the Best Loved Hymns is a 1946 picture book edited by Opal Wheeler and illustrated by Marjorie Torrey. A selection of Christian hymns and brief profiles of their creators, the book was a recipient of a 1947 Caldecott Honor for its illustrations.

References

1946 children's books
American picture books
Caldecott Honor-winning works
E. P. Dutton books